Vladislavs Fjodorovs (born 27 September 1996) is a Latvian international footballer who plays for FS Metta/Latvijas Universitāte, as a left winger.

Club career
Born in Daugavpils, Fjodorovs has played club football for Ventspils II, BFC Daugavpils, Lech Poznań II and FS METTA/Latvijas Universitāte.

Fjodorovs signed with Riga FC for the 2019 season for one year.

International career
After playing for the Latvian youth teams from under-17 to under-21 levels, he made his senior international debut for the Latvia in 2018.

References

1996 births
Living people
Sportspeople from Daugavpils
Latvian footballers
Latvia youth international footballers
Latvia under-21 international footballers
Latvia international footballers
BFC Daugavpils players
FS METTA/Latvijas Universitāte players
Riga FC players
Rīgas FS players
Association football wingers
FK Ventspils players
Lech Poznań II players
Latvian expatriate footballers
Latvian expatriate sportspeople in Poland
Expatriate footballers in Poland
Latvian Higher League players
III liga players